Christmasville is Mannheim Steamroller's tenth Christmas album. It was released in 2008 on CD by American Gramaphone and features 13 Christmas songs.  It contains a series of songs made for Universal Studios Florida for their "Grinchmas" event.

Track listing
 "Christmasville Fanfare" - 0:39
Composed by Arnie Roth
 "Messengers of Christmas" - 3:29
Composed by Chip Davis
Originally released on Christmas Celebration
 "Welcome Christmas"* - 2:33
 "You're a Mean One, Mr. Grinch"* - 2:16
 "Where Are You, Christmas?" - 3:57
From the year 2000 movie How the Grinch Stole Christmas.
Written by James Horner, Will Jennings, and Mariah Carey
 "(Everybody's Waitin' for) The Man with the Bag" - 2:30
Written by Harold Stanley, Irving Taylor, and Dudley Brooks
Originally performed by Kay Starr in 1950.
 "Something You Should Know" - 3:46
Composed by Chip Davis, Lyrics by Ed Wilson
 "Humbugs" - 1:48
Composed by Chip Davis, Lyrics by Bill Fries
 "The Fruitcake Song" - 1:00
Composed by Chip Davis, Lyrics by Michael Roddy
 "The Sign of Love" - 3:59
Composed by Chip Davis, Words by Ed Wilson
 "Trim Up the Tree"* - 1:30
 "Welcome Christmas (Reprise)"* - 3:11

* These are covers from the original How the Grinch Stole Christmas, which were written by Albert Hague (music) and Dr. Seuss (lyrics).

Musicians
Chip Davis: recorders and drums

References

Mannheim Steamroller Christmasville compact disc on Amazon.com 
Album entry on Mannheim Steamroller's shop
Actual CD

2008 Christmas albums
Mannheim Steamroller albums
Christmas albums by American artists
American Gramaphone albums
American Gramaphone Christmas albums
Classical Christmas albums
New-age Christmas albums